is a passenger railway station  located in Higashinada-ku, Kobe, Hyōgo Prefecture, Japan. It is operated by the private transportation company Hanshin Electric Railway.

Lines

Layout
The station consists of one elevated island platform serving two tracks. Part of the platform crosses the Ishiya River. The effective length of the platform is 120 meters, which corresponds to a 19-meter-class Hanshin 6-car train. However, only 4-car trains stop at this station. The Ishiyagawa rail yard is located on the Sannomiya side of the station, and there is a crossover track. There is only one ticket gate on the ground level.

Platforms

History
Ishiyagawa Station opened on the Hanshin Main Line on 12 April 1905.

Service was suspended owing to the Great Hanshin earthquake in January 1995. Restoration work on the Hanshin Main Line took 7 months to complete. The station was reconstructed as an island platform station, instead of its previous two opposed side platform configuration. 

Station numbering was introduced on 21 December 2013, with Ishiyagawa being designated as station number HS-26.

Passenger statistics
In fiscal 2020, the station was used by an average of 6,838 passengers daily

Surrounding area
Route 2 (国道2号) - Arterial route from Osaka to Fukuoka
Kobe Municipal Mikage Public  Hall (神戸市立御影公会堂)
A stage of Grave of the Fireflies (火垂るの墓の舞台)
 Ishiyagawa Park (石屋川公園)

Buses
Kobe City Bus
Hanshin Bus
"Kami Ishiya" stop for Hanshin Nishinomiya (阪神西宮) and Kobe Zeikan Mae (神戸税関前)]]

See also
List of railway stations in Japan

References

External links

 Ishiyagawa Station website 

Railway stations in Japan opened in 1905
Railway stations in Kobe
Hanshin Main Line